Andreas Felder (born 6 March 1962) is an Austrian former ski jumper. During this period he dominated the sport, together with contemporaries Jens Weißflog and Matti Nykänen. He finished in the top three overall six times in the World Cup and won the 1990/91 overall. He won his first international championship medal at the 1982 FIS Nordic World Ski Championships in Oslo with a silver medal in the team large hill event.

Career
His big breakthrough came in the 1984/85 season. In December that year he won the World cup competition in Thunder Bay, Ontario, Canada. He won six competitions in that season, but ended in 2nd place overall behind Matti Nykänen. At the 1985 FIS Nordic World Ski Championships in Seefeld, he won silver medals both in the individual normal hill and the team large hill.

He won the FIS Ski Flying World Championships 1986 in Bad Mitterndorf, the 1987 FIS Nordic World Ski Championships in Oberstdorf with gold in the individual large hill and bronze in the team large hill events. He won the ski jumping competition at the 1987 Holmenkollen ski festival. In the 1990/91 season and won his only World Cup overall and also won the team large hill gold medal at the Nordic World Ski Championships 1991.

He also won a silver medal in the team large hill at the 1992 Winter Olympics in Albertville. Felder finished his World Cup career with victory on 29 March 1992 when he won the ski jumping competition in Planica, Slovenia. After his retirement he became a manager in the Austrian Ski Federation (until March 19th, 1997). Afterwards he was a manager in the German Ski Federation's Nordic Combined Team.

Ski flying
On 9 March 1986, he tied the world ski jumping distance record with Matti Nykänen at 191 metres (627 ft) at FIS Ski Flying World Championhips on Kulm hill in Tauplitz/Bad Mitterndorf, Austria.

On 13 March 1987, he touched the ground at world record distance at 192 metres (630 ft) at the World Cup official training on Velikanka bratov Gorišek
in Planica, Yugoslavia. On the next day he landed at 191 metres (627 ft) and only tied his personal best, as this jump was achieved in the repeated third round, after and because of the world record by Piotr Fijas.

Coaching
In 1995 Felder replaced Heinz Koch as the head coach of Austrian ski jumping team. He led Reinhard Schwarzenberger to third place in Four Hills Tournament, and Andreas Goldberger to victory in the 1995-96 World Cup, and a gold medal during the FIS Ski Flying World Championships 1996. In the following season he helped Goldberger win bronze medal during the FIS Nordic World Ski Championships 1997 in Trondheim. After the end of the season Felder resigned. He became team's head coach once again in 2018, replacing Heinz Kuttin. With Felder as his coach, Stefan Kraft won bronze in Seefeld in 2019, and won the 2019-20 World Cup.

World Cup

Standings

Wins

Ski jumping world records

 Not recognized! Touched the ground at world record distance.

References

External links
 
 
 
  – click Vinnere for downloadable pdf file 

 

1962 births
Austrian male ski jumpers
Holmenkollen Ski Festival winners
Living people
Olympic ski jumpers of Austria
Ski jumpers at the 1984 Winter Olympics
Ski jumpers at the 1988 Winter Olympics
Ski jumpers at the 1992 Winter Olympics
Olympic medalists in ski jumping
FIS Nordic World Ski Championships medalists in ski jumping
Medalists at the 1992 Winter Olympics
Olympic silver medalists for Austria
People from Hall in Tirol
Sportspeople from Tyrol (state)